Joseph Wright (1818–1885) was an English architect from Hull, Yorkshire. He was a pupil of Cuthbert Brodrick and designed about 20 Primitive Methodist chapels, predominantly in East Yorkshire.

The grade II listed chapel he designed in Barton-upon-Humber was later a Salvation Army Citadel and is  an event venue known as the Joseph Wright Hall.

References

1818 births
1885 deaths
Architects from Kingston upon Hull